Zola is both a surname and a given name. It is pronounced [ zoh-luh; French zaw-la ].The moniker Zola has its roots in Africa and is derived from the Zulu language. It is a gender-neutral name that conveys the meaning of "peaceful" or "calm". The name enjoys widespread popularity in South Africa and is also embraced by other African nations. Furthermore, Zola is a commonly used name in numerous countries across the globe, including the United States.This name was ranked #990 on the US Popular Names in 2021.

Notable people with the name include:

Surname
 Arlette Zola, Swiss singer
 Arnim Zola, Marvel comics supervillain
 Calvin Zola (born 1984), Congo DR footballer
 Émile Zola (1840–1902), French novelist
 Gianfranco Zola (born 1966), Italian football player and manager
 Giuseppe Zola (1672 – 1743) Italian painter
 Irving Zola (1935–1994), American activist and writer

Given name
 Zola Budd (born 1966), South African athlete
Zola Cooper (1904–1954), American cancer researcher
 Zola Davis (born 1975), American football player
 Zola Jesus (born 1989), stage name of Nika Roza Danilova, American singer
 Zola Levitt (1938–2006), American religious leader
 Zola Matumona (born 1981), Congo DR footballer
 Zola Taylor (born 1934), American singer, member of The Platters

References

External links

Surnames of Italian origin